Zuzana Rehák-Štefečeková (born 15 January 1984) is a Slovak sports shooter. She won the gold medal in the Women's Trap event at the 2020 Summer Olympics and the silver medal at the 2008 and 2012 Summer Olympics.

Career
Her first big successes were bronze medals from 2002 World and European Junior Championships. She also placed fourth at the 2001 World Junior Championships and fifth at the 1999 World Junior Championship. As a junior, she also competed in double trap, her best results were the 6th place from the 2001 World Junior Championships and 7th place from the 1999 World Junior Championship.

Olympic Games
She entered the 2008 Summer Olympics as a holder of the qualification (74 hits) and final (96) world records which she achieved in 2006 at the World Cup event in Qingyuan. She won the qualification round, but placed second in the final, where she missed two more targets than Satu Mäkelä-Nummela of Finland. Her world records lasted to the 2012 Summer Olympics, where they were overcome by Jessica Rossi of Italy, who missed only one target in the whole competition. Štefečeková was the most successful in the silver medal shoot-off, beating Delphine Réau of France and Alessandra Perilli of San Marino. She is the first sports shooter who managed to defend her medal in the women's trap competition at the Olympic Games. Despite qualifying for the 2016 Summer Olympics, she did not compete due her maternity leave.

Rehák-Štefečeková competed in two events at the 2020 Summer Olympics, women's trap (individual) and mixed trap team with Erik Varga. She won the qualification in the individual trap event, setting the new world and Olympic record by hitting all 125 targets. She won the gold medal in the finals, the first ever gold medal for Slovakia from shooting events. Rehák-Štefečeková managed to hit 43 of 50 targets, one more than the silver medalist Kayle Browning. She thus became the most successful shooter in Olympic women's trap, with one gold and two silver medals (no other Olympic champion has ever managed to win another medal in this event). In the mixed trap team event she and Erik Varga placed third in the qualification, missing only one target out of 75, while Varga missed three. They advanced into the bronze medal match, where they managed hit the equal number of targets (42) as Madelynn Bernau and Brian Burrows from the USA, but ultimately lost in the subsequent shoot-off, finishing fourth.

World and European Championships
Competing at the senior level, Štefečeková won her first medal at the 2003 World Championships, where she finished third. After placing 10th in 2006, 9th in 2007 and 6th in 2009, she won the gold medal at the 2010 World Championships, with 72 hits in qualification and 19 in final, beating Liu Yingzi and Jessica Rossi. She added a silver medal in 2011, where only Liu Yingzi defeated her and a bronze medal in 2017. Her biggest success came at the 2018 World Championships, where she won the gold medal not only in the individual event, defeating Wang Xiaojing in the final shoot-off, but also in the mixed trap with Erik Varga.

Her total score from the European Championships in the single-target individual trap event is two gold (2015 and 2016), three silver (2008, 2010 and 2013) and three bronze (2006, 2014 and 2018) medals. She also won the silver medal in the individual double trap event at the 2018 European Championships and five medals in team events: gold in 2018 (mixed double trap with Hubert Andrzej Olejnik), silver in 2015 (women's trap team) and 2018 (mixed trap with Erik Varga) and bronze in 2013 and 2017 (women's trap team).

Other competitions
At the first European Games, with Erik Varga, they won a gold medal in the mixed trap event. She also won seven individual World Cup events, including two World Cup finals.

Personal life
Štefečeková is a committed Christian, she studied missionary and charitable work in Bratislava. In 2016, she gave birth to a son, Nathan.

References

External links

1984 births
Living people
Sportspeople from Nitra
Shooters at the 2008 Summer Olympics
Shooters at the 2012 Summer Olympics
Shooters at the 2020 Summer Olympics
Olympic shooters of Slovakia
Olympic gold medalists for Slovakia
Olympic silver medalists for Slovakia
Slovak female sport shooters
World record holders in shooting
Trap and double trap shooters
Olympic medalists in shooting
Medalists at the 2008 Summer Olympics
Medalists at the 2012 Summer Olympics
Medalists at the 2020 Summer Olympics
Shooters at the 2015 European Games
European Games gold medalists for Slovakia
European Games medalists in shooting
Universiade medalists in shooting
Universiade gold medalists for Slovakia
Universiade bronze medalists for Slovakia
Shooters at the 2019 European Games
20th-century Slovak women
21st-century Slovak women